LTSS can mean:
 Lutheran Theological Southern Seminary
 Livermore Time Sharing System
 Long-Term Support and Service (or Long-Term Services and Support)
 in medical language (also long-term care), concerning people with disabilities
 in data-processing language, it means extended support of software (usually enterprise software)
 Looney Tunes Super Stars, a series of Looney Tunes DVDs
 Lord Tweedsmuir Secondary School, a high school near Vancouver, British Columbia

LTSs is also sometimes used as the plural of LTS, which can mean:
 Large technical system
 Labelled transition system